Vexillum semicostatum is a species of small sea snail, marine gastropod mollusk in the family Costellariidae, the ribbed miters.

Description
The shell size varies between 10 mm and 22 mm

Distribution
This species is distributed in the Red Sea, the Indian Ocean along the Mascarene Basin, Madagascar and in the Pacific Ocean along Queensland, Australia and Papua New Guinea.

References

 Drivas, J. & M. Jay (1988). Coquillages de La Réunion et de l'île Maurice
 Turner H. 2001. Katalog der Familie Costellariidae Macdonald, 1860. Conchbooks. 1–100-page(s): 59

External links
 
 W.O.Cernohorsky, The Mitridae of Fiji - The Veliger v. 8 (1965-1966)

semicostatum
Gastropods described in 1838